Brian Allen Treggs (born June 11, 1970) is a former American football wide receiver who played one season with the Seattle Seahawks of the National Football League (NFL). He played college football at the University of California, Berkeley and attended Carson High School in Carson, California.

College career
Treggs played for the California Golden Bears from 1988 to 1991. He finished his college career as the Golden Bears' all-time leader in receiving yards with 2,335 and receptions with 167. He also recorded fifteen receiving touchdowns. Treggs earned second-team All-Pac-10 honors his junior year. He also garnered honorable mention All-Pac-10 accolades as a sophomore and senior. He was inducted into the Cal Athletic Hall of Fame in 2015. Treggs received his legal studies degree from California in 1992.

Professional career
Treggs signed with the Seattle Seahawks of the NFL in 1992 and played in two games for the team during the 1992 season.

Personal life
Treggs' son, Philadelphia Eagles wide receiver Bryce Treggs, also played for the California Golden Bears. Brian works in law. He also coaches football at St. John Bosco High School in Bellflower, California.

References

External links
Just Sports Stats
College stats

Living people
1970 births
Players of American football from Los Angeles
American football wide receivers
California Golden Bears football players
Seattle Seahawks players
High school football coaches in California
Carson High School (Carson, California) alumni
Sports coaches from Los Angeles